Carrere Group is a television production and distribution company based in Aubervilliers, France.  It is a member of the CAC Small 90.
REDIRECTION

External links 
 Corporate website
 Profile on Google Finance

Television production companies of France
Mass media in Paris